The California Cup Distance Handicap is an American Thoroughbred horse race run annually during the autumn Oak Tree Racing Association meet at Santa Anita Park in Arcadia, California. The race covers a distance of 1¼ miles on turf, and is open to fillies and mares at least three years old and bred in the state of California. The event winnings currently include a purse of $100,000 and a trophy.

The California Cup Distance Handicap is part of the "California Cup Day" series of races, intended to call attention to and honor the California Thoroughbred racing and breeding industry.

Past winners

 2008 - Distant Victory (Victor Espinoza)
 2007 - Imagine (Corey Nakatani) 
 2006 - Special Heather
 2005 - Moscow Burning
 2004 - Test The Waters
 2003 - Moscow Burning
 2002 - Nicole's Pursuit

(Moscow Burning is the all-time leading earner among Cal-bred females and a two-time winner of the California Cup Distance Handicap.)

References
 Oak Tree racing meet at Santa Anita
 California Cup Distance Handicap at Pedigree Query.com

Horse races in California
Santa Anita Park
Graded stakes races in the United States
Racing series for horses
Turf races in the United States
Middle distance horse races for fillies and mares